Big Mac is a nickname of:

Enzo Maccarinelli (born 1980), Welsh former professional boxer
Jimmy Macullar (1855-1924), American Major League Baseball player
Robert MacPherson (BMX rider) (born 1971), retired BMX rider
Massimo Maccarone (born 1979), Italian footballer
Alex McDonald (prospector) (1859–1909), Canadian gold prospector who made and lost a fortune in the Klondike
John McEnroe (born 1959), retired professional tennis player
Mark McGwire (born 1963), retired Major League Baseball player
Jamie McMurray (born 1976), auto racing driver

See also 

 
 
 Big Mac (disambiguation)
 Little Mac (disambiguation)
 Mac (disambiguation)

Lists of people by nickname